Estacada Alternative High School is a public alternative high school in Estacada, Oregon, United States.

Academics
In 2008, 2% of the school's seniors received their high school diploma. Of 169 students, 4 graduated, 119 dropped out, 1 received a modified diploma, and 45 are still in high school.

References

High schools in Clackamas County, Oregon
Alternative schools in Oregon
Public high schools in Oregon